Ancestral Temple may refer to:

Ancestral shrines, Chinese temples or halls dedicated to deified ancestors
Ancestral Temple (TV series), a 2009 Chinese TV series

Tourist attractions
Imperial Ancestral Temple, a temple in the Imperial City, Beijing, China
Foshan Ancestral Temple, a temple in Foshan, Guangdong, China
Thế Miếu, a temple in the Imperial City, Huế, Thừa Thiên-Huế, Vietnam
Triệu Tổ miếu, another temple in the Imperial City, Huế, Thừa Thiên-Huế, Vietnam

See also
Ancestor veneration in China